= Locule =

Small cavity or compartment within an organ or part of an organism

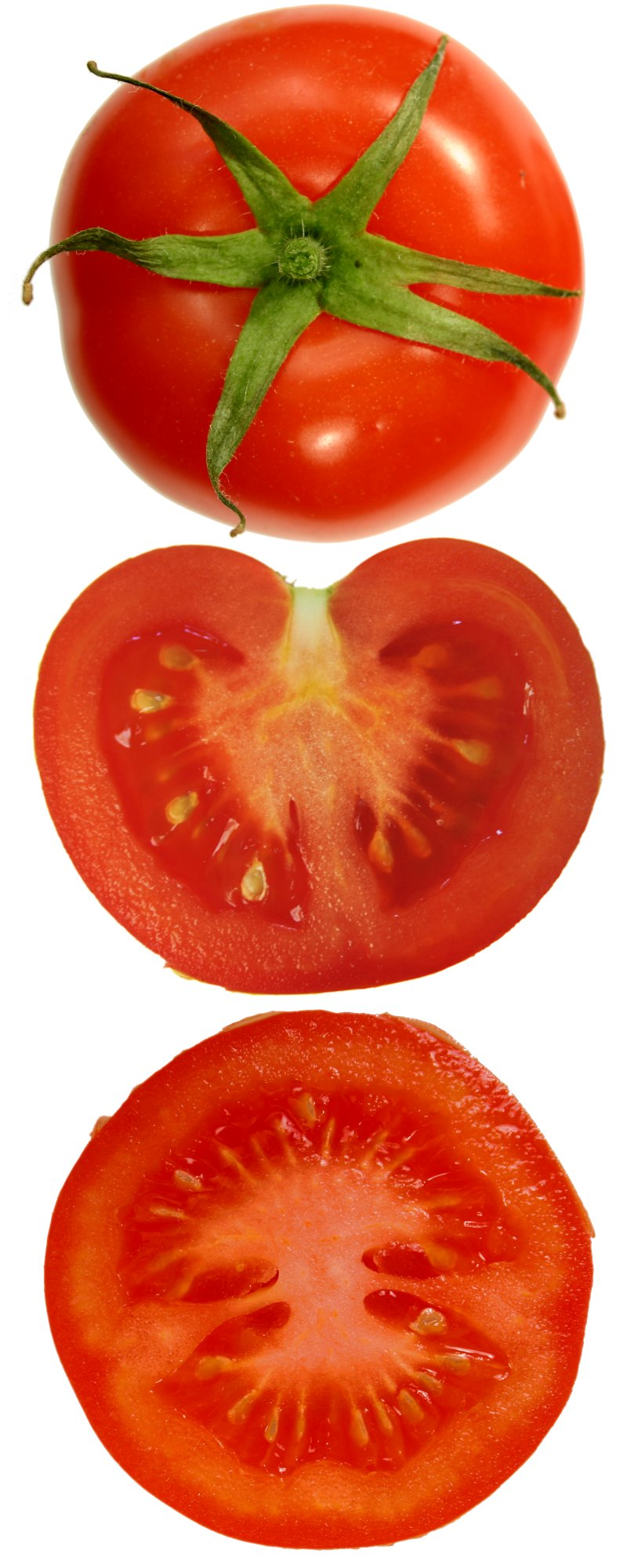
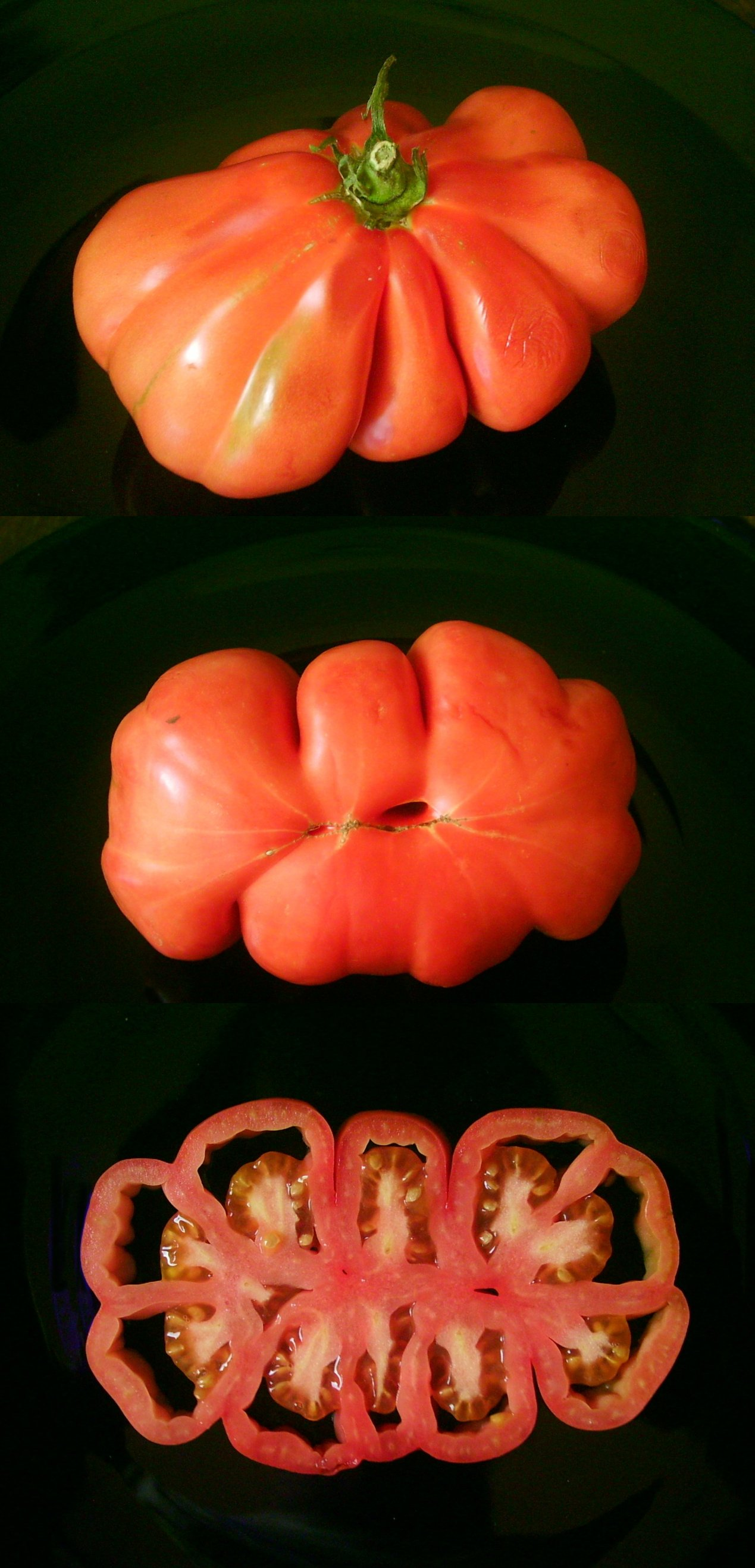
A bilocular and a multilocular tomato fruit

A locule (pl.: locules) or loculus (Latin for 'little place'; pl.: loculi) is a small cavity or compartment within an organ or part of an organism (animal, plant, or fungus).

In angiosperms (flowering plants), the term locule usually refers to a chamber within an ovary (gynoecium or carpel) of the flower and fruits. Depending on the number of locules in the ovary, fruits can be classified as unilocular (uni-locular), bilocular, trilocular, or multilocular. The number of locules present in a gynoecium may be equal to or less than the number of carpels. The locules contain the ovules or seeds.

The term may also refer to chambers within anthers containing pollen.

In ascomycetous fungi, locules are chambers within the hymenium in which the perithecia develop.
